The Mixed Doubles tournament of the 2015 BWF World Junior Championships is held on November 10–15. The defending champion of the last edition is Huang Kaixiang / Chen Qingchen from China.

Seeded

  Zheng Siwei / Chen Qingchen (champion)
  Melih Turgut / Fatma Nur Yavuz (third round)
  Ben Lane / Jessica Pugh (quarter-final)
  Frederik Søgaard / Ditte Soby (second round)
  Fachriza Abimanyu / Apriani Rahayu (semi-final)
  Goh Sze Fei / Teoh Mei Xing (third round)
  Yang Ming-tse / Lee Chia-hsin (third round)
  He Jiting / Du Yue (final)
  Andika Ramadiansyah / Marsheilla Gischa Islami (fourth round)
  Jason Wong Guang Liang / Elaine Chua Yi Ling (fourth round)
  Pakin Kuna-Anuvit / Kwanchanok Sudjaipraparat (fourth round)
  Miha Ivanič / Nika Arih (third round)
  Thom Gicquel / Delphine Delrue (fourth round)
  Yantoni Edy Saputra / Mychelle Chrystine Bandaso (second round)
  Yahya Adi Kumara / Rahmadhani Hastiyanti Putri (second round)
  Thomas Baures / Vimala Heriau (second round)

Draw

Finals

Top Half

Section 1

Section 2

Section 3

Section 4

Bottom Half

Section 5

Section 6

Section 7

Section 8

References
Main Draw

Mixed
2015 in youth sport
World Junior